Turgay Ciner (born 1956) is a Turkish industrialist and founder of Ciner Group, which has investments in Turkey, the United Kingdom, and the United States. Ciner's company operates primarily in four industries: energy and mining, glass and chemicals, shipping and maritime, and media. Ciner was born in Hopa, Artvin Province, in 1956.

He acquired Show TV from the Savings Deposit Insurance Fund of Turkey in 2013. Ciner also owns the football club Kasımpaşa S.K.

References

External links
 Ciner Group official website

1956 births
Living people
Turkish businesspeople
Turkish billionaires
Turkish mass media owners
Turkish people of Laz descent
Ciner Holding
People from Hopa